Lauren DeFazio Fisher (born September 14, 1982) is an American former professional tennis player.

Born and raised in Pittsburgh, Fisher competed in collegiate tennis for the UCLA Bruins between 2000 and 2004, twice earning All-American honors for doubles. In 2004 she partnered with Daniela Berček to win the NCAA Division I doubles championship.

Fisher featured in the doubles main draw of the 2004 US Open, as a wildcard pairing with Raquel Kops-Jones.

From 2004 and 2006, Fisher competed on the professional tour and won three doubles titles on the ITF Women's Circuit.

ITF finals

Doubles: 4 (3–1)

References

External links
 
 

1982 births
Living people
American female tennis players
UCLA Bruins women's tennis players
Tennis players from Pittsburgh